Tarzan of Manisa is a 1994 Turkish biographical drama film about Ahmet bin Carlak, also known as the "Tarzan of Manisa" 1899–1963, directed by Orhan Oğuz. The film was selected as the Turkish entry for the Best Foreign Language Film at the 67th Academy Awards, but was not accepted as a nominee.

Cast
 Talat Bulut as Ahmet Bedevi 'Tarzan of Manisa'
 Serap Saglar
 Pinar Afsar
 Ayton Sert
 Kutay Köktürk
 Özlem Savas
 Nihat Nikerel

See also
 List of submissions to the 67th Academy Awards for Best Foreign Language Film
 List of Turkish submissions for the Academy Award for Best Foreign Language Film

References

External links
 

1994 films
1994 drama films
Turkish drama films
1990s Turkish-language films